Dimitrios Polydoropoulos (born ) is a Greek male  track cyclist. He competed in the team pursuit event at the 2010 and 2011 UCI Track Cycling World Championships.

References

External links
 Profile at cyclingarchives.com

1989 births
Living people
Greek track cyclists
Greek male cyclists
Place of birth missing (living people)
Sportspeople from Athens
21st-century Greek people